Ennio Appignanesi (18 June 1925 – 26 March 2015) was an Italian Catholic archbishop.

Ordained to the priesthood in 1950, Appignanesi became auxiliary bishop of the Diocese of Lucera. He was eventually named the archbishop of Potenza-Muro-Lucano-Marsico Nuevo, Italy in 1993, and retired in 2001.

References

1925 births
2015 deaths
Italian Roman Catholic archbishops